Curtis Sheppard (born about 1919) was an American boxer.

Life 
Sheppard was from Philadelphia, Pennsylvania. Sheppard was a popular fighter during the 1930s and 1940s. His nickname was "The Hatchetman." As was common during his era, no records of his birthdate, or his death date (if he is dead), are kept.

Boxing career 
Sheppard never received a world title shot. He was what in boxing is described as a "journeyman." However, his career had many ups and downs, which made him an interesting boxer for fans to watch. The February 2005 issue of Ring magazine, described him as a "gatekeeper," a fighter who stood in the way of other boxers seeking a title shot.

Sheppard began his career as a professional boxer on September 24, 1938, knocking out Larry White in the first round at Madison Square Garden. His first defeat was on November 1 of that year, against Danny Peal, by decision. Sheppard would win four fights in a row, including one against Herbie Katz, who had an immediate rematch, with Sheppard's winning streak stopped at four, when Katz beat him by decision.

In his next fight, November 18, 1939, Sheppard met the future world Heavyweight champion Jersey Joe Walcott. Sheppard lost that fight by an eight-round decision.

After another win and a loss, he met Tony Musto, another fighter of the era who is remembered for fighting many name boxers. Musto beat Sheppard by a ten-round decision, on July 1, 1940.

Sheppard won three and had one no contest in his next four bouts, including a win over Lee Q. Murray. His no-contest bout was against Elza Thompson, on April 17 of 1941, in Pittsburgh. But then he lost again, by decision to Willie Reddish, eleven days after his fight with Thompson.

In June of that year, he beat Q. Murray; then, on August 2, he lost by decision to future Hall of Famer Jimmy Bivins. Sheppard won five of his next seven fights, until on July 27, 1942, he lost to future world Light Heavyweight champion Joey Maxim, by a ten-round decision. He won two of his next four fights. The two fights he did not win during that span included another no-contest, this time against Hubert Hood, in six rounds.

Maxim was the world's #1 challenger in the Light Heavyweight division at the time, and he only needed one more win to earn a world title shot. Because of this, Maxim's management, thinking that Sheppard would be an easy opponent, scheduled a match between Sheppard and Maxim.

Sheppard temporarily spoiled Maxim's plans, knocking him out in round one of their rematch, on March 10. This result, which would be the only knockout loss in Maxim's career, was  a surprise to Ring Magazine writers and many boxing fans.  Needing to restore his image in order to fight for the world Light Heavyweight title, Maxim signed for an immediate rematch with Sheppard, which would be the third fight between the two boxers. Maxim prevailed this time around, by a ten-round decision.

While Maxim went on and became world champion, Sheppard continued to fight anyone, anytime. Only twenty-six days later, he went into the ring with a fighter who was 12-0 before their fight: Sheppard defeated Clint Conway by a ten-round decision on April 26.

Sheppard won only two of his next five fights, before embarking on a seven-fight win streak. The first three wins were first-round knockouts, including one over Conway, on December 12, 1943. On January 24, 1944, he had one of his best performances when he beat future challenger for the world heavyweight championship Gus Dorazio by a ten-round unanimous decision.

His win streak was stopped by Buddy Walker, who defeated Sheppard on February 6, by a ten-round decision.

His next fourteen fights were almost all against the elite of the Light Heavyweight division: He beat Buddy Walker by a knockout in eight rounds in a rematch. Then he beat Tony Shucco by knockout in five, before losing to Q. Murray and to future world champion Melio Bettina, both by ten-round decisions. Then he beat Alf Brown, Dan Merritt, and Buddy Walker, all except Walker by decision. Walker was knocked out in nine rounds. Then Sheppard was knocked out in seven rounds by Perk Daniels on April 9, 1945. This was followed by a points loss at the hands of Jimmy Bivins.  Sheppard then had consecutive wins over Nate Bolden, Johnny Allen, and Perkins in a rematch, before facing Jersey Joe Walcott again, and Archie Moore. He dropped decisions to Walcott and Moore, but Moore would later claim that, of all of his opponents, which included Bob Satterfield, Ezzard Charles, Rocky Marciano, Floyd Patterson, and Muhammad Ali, it was Sheppard who hit him the hardest.

Sheppard would fight twenty three more times, winning fourteen and losing nine. He lost another fight to Moore, but "the king of knockouts" could never knock Sheppard out, as he had to settle for a second decision victory over Sheppard. Sheppard also lost to Bivins, Q. Murray and to Rusty Payne, each of them twice by decision, during that last 23-fight stretch. His second fight with Payne, on January 19, 1949, was his last professional boxing fight.

Sheppard compiled a record of 49 wins and 33 losses, with 2 no-contests, and 32 knockouts.

References

Boxers from Philadelphia
1910s births
Possibly living people
American male boxers